Stanisław Jakub Skarżyński (1 May 1899 − 26 June 1942) was a lieutenant colonel in the Polish Air Force and aviator famous for his transatlantic solo flight in 1933.

Early military career
In 1916–17 Skarżyński was a member of the Polish Military Organisation (POW). In November 1918 he volunteered for the newly created Polish Army, and commanded units disarming German soldiers in Warta. He then fought in the Polish-Soviet War with the infantry, being promoted to second lieutenant in 1919. He was wounded but returned to the front. During the battle of Radzymin he was severely wounded in one leg on 16 August 1920. The infected wound needed long rehabilitation, and Skarżyński always limped thereafter. Unable to continue serving in the infantry, he managed to transfer to the military aviation arm. 

He completed pilot training in Bydgoszcz in 1925, and served in the 1st Aviation Regiment in Warsaw. In 1927 he became a Flying Captain (kapitan pilot). Between 1 and 5 February May 1931 together with Lt. Andrzej Markiewicz, he flew around Africa in the Polish-designed aircraft PZL Ł-2 (registration SP-AFA), a total distance of 25,770 km.

Transatlantic flight
On 7/8 May 1933 Skarzynski flew solo in a small single-seater Polish tourist airplane RWD-5bis (SP-AJU) across the southern Atlantic, from Saint-Louis, Senegal to Maceio in Brazil. The flight took 20 hours 30 minutes (17 hours 15 minutes above the ocean). He crossed 3,582 km, establishing a distance World Record in a FAI tourist plane category II (weight below 450 kg / 1000 lb). The plane had no radio nor safety equipment, due to weight restrictions. The RWD-5bis remains the smallest plane to ever to have flown across the Atlantic. Plans of his flight were kept secret. It became a part of Warsaw – Rio de Janeiro flight, between 27 April and 10 May 17,885 km long. He then flew on to Buenos Aires and returned to Europe by ship.

Later service and World War II
In 1934, he was promoted to major and commanded a bomber squadron. From 1938, he was deputy C.O. of the 4th Aviation Regiment in Toruń, with a rank of lieutenant colonel (podpułkownik pilot). In April 1939, he became President of the Polish Aero Club. In August 1939 he was sent to Romania as the deputy air attaché.

After the outbreak of World War II, he helped in transporting Polish pilots, fleeing from Poland, through Romania to France, where the Polish Air Force was recreated. In 1940 Skarżyński, after the fall of France, helped ship 17,000 Polish airmen to Britain, where he became commanding officer of Polish Flying Schools at RAF Hucknall and then RAF Newton. 

He requested a combat posting, and was assigned as C.O. of RAF Lindholme and No. 305 Polish Bomber Squadron. On 26 June 1942, while returning from a mission over Bremen, an engine stalled in his Wellington above the North Sea. Skarżyński ditched the heavy damaged aircraft in the stormy sea and all the crew were saved. Skarżyński, leaving the Wellington last, was washed out to sea and was the only crew member lost. He was later buried with full military honours on the Dutch island of Terschelling.

Honours

He was awarded the Virtuti Militari 5th class (for the Polish-Soviet war), Cross of Independence, Order of Polonia Restituta 4th class, Krzyż Walecznych (four times), Golden and Silver Cross of Merit, the French Legion d'Honneur and the Brazilian Order of the Southern Cross. The FAI awarded him the Louis Blériot medal (1936) of which he was one of the first recipients.

Posthumously he was made a full colonel (pułkownik pilot) and awarded the Order of Polonia Restituta 2nd class by the President of Poland. There are numerous streets and schools named after him. He is the Patron of the Aeroclub of Włocławek and of the 13th Transport Squadron in Kraków. On 10 August 2009 the Minister of National Defense signed the Decree to appoint him as Patron of 8 Air Base in Kraków – Balice, which now is named after him.

Sources

 

 
  Konieczny, Jerzy and Malinowski, Tadeusz: Mała encyklopedia lotników polskich, Warsaw, 1983, pp. 155–164, Skarzynski, Maciej

1899 births
1942 deaths
People from Sieradz County
Polish aviators
Polish Army officers
Polish Military Organisation members
Recipients of the Silver Cross of the Virtuti Militari
Commanders with Star of the Order of Polonia Restituta
Recipients of the Cross of Independence
Recipients of the Cross of Valour (Poland)
Recipients of the Gold Cross of Merit (Poland)
Recipients of the Silver Cross of Merit (Poland)
Recipients of the Legion of Honour
Polish World War II pilots
Aviators killed in aviation accidents or incidents
Polish people of the Polish–Soviet War
Polish military personnel killed in World War II
Polish Royal Air Force pilots of World War II